Abulum is the solo debut album by Toad the Wet Sprocket singer/songwriter Glen Phillips. The album was produced on both CD and DVD formats. The DVD features the bonus track "Sleep of the Blessed".

Track listing
All songs written by Glen Phillips, except where noted otherwise.

 "Careless" – 3:28
 "Men Just Leave" – 3:08
 "Back On My Feet" (Craig Northey, Glen Phillips) – 3:13
 "Fred Meyers" – 3:15
 "My Own Town" – 4:45
 "It Takes Time" – 3:21
 "Drive By" – 2:59
 "Darkest Hour" – 4:09
 "Professional Victim" – 4:16
 "Train Wreck" – 5:14
 "Maya" – 3:35
 "Sleep of the Blessed" (Bonus track on DVD) – 4:14

Personnel
Glen Phillips – guitar, vocals
 Richard Causon – accordion, keyboards [chamberlin], piano, Wurlitzer organ
 Jennifer Condos – bass
 Sandy Chila – drums, Wurlitzer organ, nass synthesizer, percussion, strings
 Ethan Johns – guitar, harmony vocals, tambourine, percussion [shaker], mellotron, drums, keyboards [chamberlin], percussion

References

Glen Phillips albums
2001 debut albums
Albums produced by Ethan Johns